This is a list of songs released by Scottish alternative rock band Sucioperro on their albums, EPs and singles. Unreleased songs known to have been recorded, demos and songs only played live are listed below as well.

Released songs

Album songs

Random Acts Of Intimacy (2006)
01. "The Crushing Of The Little People"
02. "Wolf Carnival"
03. "Grace And Out Of Me"
04. "Random Acts Of Intimacy"
05. "Dialog On The 2"
06. "I Don't Hate It, I Accept It"
07. "Tem V Com"
08. "Apathy=Inaction"
09. "List Of What Needs Said"
10. "The Drop"
11. "The Final Confessions Of Mabel Stark"

Pain Agency (2009)
01. "Liquids"
02. "The Dissident Code"
03. "Mums' Bad Punk Music"
04. "Are You Convinced?"
05. "Don't Change (What You Can't Understand)"
06. "Hate Filters"
07. "You Can't Lose (What You Don't Have)"
08. "Conception Territory"
09. "No. 273"
10. "I Have Reached My Limit"

The Heart String & How To Pull It (2011)
01. "Running From All That Doesn't Tempt You"
02. "Threads"
03. "Reflexes Of The Dead"
04. "Out & Over"
05. "I Jumped Into The Heart Of A Black Situation"
06. "Ideals Have Value"
07. "Invisible Monsters"
08. "Is That Why You Pull Me In?"
09. "Delicious"
10. "Landslide"
11. "Hands"

Fused (2012)
01. "A River Of Blood"
02. "To Nothing"
03. "Wolves"
04. "What A Fucking Chump"
05. "Rabbits In Boxes"
06. "Pig Ravens"
07. "Mein Kleine Taube"
08. "Discipline Office"
09. "Where At Dat Wild At"
10. "Glass Castle"
11. "Fused"
12. "You Should Get Some Sleep"

B-sides

Dialog On The 2 (2006)
"Conversation With A Wasp"
"The Altruist"

The Drop (2006)
"Dead Leaf Echo"
"The Ruins"

Mums' Bad Punk Music (2008)
"We Are The Mirrors In The Mirrors Of Each Other"
"Crush-ed"
"Pain Agency"

Don't Change (What You Can't Understand) (2009)
"+ve/-ve"
"Lizard Tongue"

The Dissident Code (2009)
"Riverside Method"
"Blonde Parade"
"Dirty Dirty Sick Sick"

EP only tracks

Why Bliss Destroy (2002)
"Hangover"
"Virginia"
"Love In The Guise Of Friendship"
"Capable Of More"

The Hidden Perils Of Dancing (2004)
"Imitation Heaven"
"Found You Makin'"
"The Hidden Perils Of Dancing"

Tour EP #1 (2005)
"Imitation Heaven (Acoustic)"
"9:05 (Strings Version)"
"Love In The Guise Of Friendship Parts 1 & 2"
"Eviscerated (Album Demo)"

I'm Not In Charge (2009)
"I'm Not In Charge"
"Fail/Succeed" 
"The Lonesome Tree"

Alternate versions of album songs

The Hidden Perils Of Dancing (2004)
"The Drop"

Tour EP #1 (2005)
"The Drop (Acoustic)"
"Apathy=Inaction (Acoustic)"
"Imitation Heaven (Acoustic)"

Unreleased songs
"Ghosts And Shadows"
"Animals"

External links

Sucioperro